CVO may refer to:

Science and technology
 Cascades Volcano Observatory, Vancouver, Washington, US
 Chief veterinary officer, the head of a veterinary authority
 Circumventricular organs, positioned around the ventricular system of the brain
 Common velocity obstacle, a type of velocity obstacle
 Covid-Organics, an Artemisia-based drink purported to prevent and cure coronavirus disease 2019

Other uses
 Chief visionary officer, an executive function in a company
 Commander of the Royal Victorian Order, membership of a British order of chivalry
 Corvallis Municipal Airport (IATA airport code), Oregon, US 
 CVO: Covert Vampiric Operations, a comic book franchise published by IDW Publishing
 Harley-Davidson CVO, a category of limited-edition Harley-Davidson motorcycles produced by its Custom Vehicle Operations group
Customer Verified Operation, used in Service Desk operations to note the customer validated the fix put in place by the technician.